99 Rock may refer to several different radio stations in the United States:

 WPLR in Connecticut
 WKSM in Florida
 WFRD in New Hampshire